Golan Regional Council is a regional council that supervises regional services to Israeli settlements located on the Golan Heights. It is made up of 18 moshavim, 10 kibbutzim, and 4 community settlements. The council headquarters is in the town of Katzrin. The current Head of Council is Haim Rokach.

The Golan Heights were captured by Israel from Syria in the Six-Day War of 1967 and Israeli law was imposed there in 1981. They are internationally recognized as Syrian territory occupied by Israel. The settlements in the Golan are illegal under international law.

Heads of council
 Moshe Gorlik (1978–79)
 Eytan Lis (1979–88)
 Yehuda Vulman (1988–2001)
 Eli Malka (2001–2018)
 Haim Rokach (2018–)

Shimon Sheves was deputy council head in the early years of the council's existence.

Settlements

References

 
Regional councils in Northern District (Israel)
Israeli settlement
Golan Heights